Colorado's 15th Senate district is one of 35 districts in the Colorado Senate. It has been represented by Democrat Janice Marchman since 2023. Prior to redistricting the district was represented by Republicans Rob Woodward and Kevin Lundberg.

Geography
District 15 covers nearly all of Larimer County outside of Fort Collins, including the communities of Loveland, Estes Park, Berthoud, Wellington, and Laporte.

The district is located entirely within Colorado's 2nd congressional district, and overlaps with the 49th, 51st, 52nd, and 53rd districts of the Colorado House of Representatives.

Recent election results
Colorado state senators are elected to staggered four-year terms; under normal circumstances, the 15th district holds elections in midterm years. The 2022 election will be the first held under the state's new district lines.

2022

Historical election results

2018

2014

Federal and statewide results in District 15

References 

15
Larimer County, Colorado